Bullata matthewsi, common name : Matthew's marginella, is a species of sea snail, a marine gastropod mollusk in the family Marginellidae, the margin snails.

Description
The shell size varies between 40 mm and 53 mm

Distribution
This species is distributed in the Atlantic Ocean along Northern Brazil.

References

 Cossignani T. (2006). Marginellidae & Cystiscidae of the World. L'Informatore Piceno. 408pp

External links
 

Marginellidae